Michael Schmid (born 2 January 1988) is a Swiss rower. He competed in the men's lightweight double sculls event at the 2016 Summer Olympics.

References

External links
 

1988 births
Living people
Swiss male rowers
Olympic rowers of Switzerland
Rowers at the 2016 Summer Olympics
Place of birth missing (living people)
World Rowing Championships medalists